Following is the list of monuments and archaeological sites in Khyber Pakhtunkhwa, Pakistan. A total 85 sites in the province were under the protection of the Federal Government. The list includes the only completely inscribed UNESCO World Heritage Site in Khyber Pakhtunkhwa, the Buddhist Ruins of Takht-i-Bahi and Neighbouring City Remains at Sahr-i-Bahlol as well as sites which are part of the World Heritage Sites at Taxila.

Protected/Unprotected sites

Until the passing of the Eighteenth Amendment to the Constitution of Pakistan, the protected sites were under the Federal Government.

|}

Sites in what was previously FATA

|}

References ;

Buildings and structures in Khyber Pakhtunkhwa
Archaeological sites in Pakistan
Cultural heritage sites in Khyber Pakhtunkhwa